Yanuv is a moshav in central Israel. Located in the Sharon plain near Netanya and Tulkarm, it falls under the jurisdiction of Lev HaSharon Regional Council.

History
Before the 20th century the area formed part of the Forest of Sharon. It was an open woodland dominated by Mount Tabor Oak, which extended from Kfar Yona in the north to Ra'anana in the south. The local Arab inhabitants traditionally used the area for pasture, firewood and intermittent cultivation. The intensification of settlement and agriculture in the coastal plain during the 19th century led to deforestation and subsequent environmental degradation.

The village was founded on 21 March 1950 by a kvutza of immigrants from Tunisia on land which had been owned by a Nabulsi effendi prior to the 1948 Arab–Israeli War.
 Its name was taken from Proverbs 10:31: "From the mouth of the just will come forth wisdom".

Part of the village's homes were built with Norwegian funds, following the Hurum air disaster, in which over two dozen Jewish children on their way to Israel died. The sole survivor of the disaster settled in Yanuv, as did some of the families of victims that later immigrated to Israel. A memorial was later created, funded by the friendship association Friends of Israel in the Norwegian Labour Movement (Norwegian: Venner av Israel i Norsk Arbeiderbevegelse).

Notable residents
Lonah Chemtai Salpeter, Kenyan-Israeli Olympic marathon runner

References

Further reading 

Waage, Hilde Henriksen (1996): Norge -Israels beste venn. Norsk Midtøsten-politikk 1949–1956. Universitetsforlaget. p. 30-45. 
Engstad, Paul (1996): Norsk arbeiderbevegelses samarbeid med Israel og innsats for fred i Midtøsten : Israel 50 år 1948-1998. VINA Oslo 1998.

Moshavim
Populated places established in 1950
Populated places in Central District (Israel)
1950 establishments in Israel
Tunisian-Jewish culture in Israel